Gasper Crasto (born 8 October 1968) is a former Indian footballer who played for Salgaocar F.C. from 1991 to 1998.

The youngest child of Marianinha and Rafael Crasto hailing from Firgulem-Shantinagar, Navelim, Goa. Gasper was born on 8 October 1968 and baptized at the church of Our Lady of Rosary, Navelim. After his initial education at Rosary High School, Navelim and S. P. Chowgule College of Arts and Science – Goa, Crasto acquired a Diploma in Mechanical Engineering in 1991 from Fr. Agnel College, Verna, then affiliated to the Bombay Board.

Having a flair for football right from his school days Crasto got to play for one of the top clubs of India – Salgaocar Football Club whom he served 8 years and played all over India apart from holding a job in their establishment.

Before playing for Salgaocars, Crasto captained Agassaim Youth Club in the Goa First Div in the 1989–90 season. The team finished 6th in a 10-team league that season; Crasto emerged top scorer for the club. Earlier as a 16-year-old, Crasto first played for Davorlim Sporting in the Second Division tier of the Goa league, and continued for the subsequent 2 seasons. Crasto landed in Kuwait in 1999. Currently working for Action Consultancy Bureau as a Business Development Engineer in the Oil and Gas Sector.

Football

First Team: Navelim Soccerites (All Goa U-14 Champions 1983)

South Goa Champion with Rosary High School in the Subroto Cup – 1984–85

Played for Navelim in all major Inter-village Tournaments of Goa from 1987 onwards – major inter-village clubs that Crasto played included Navelim Sporting, Davorlim Sporting, Enfermos FC, Mandopa YC, etc.

Champions with Fr. Agnels in the West Zone All India Football (Twice: Ahmednagar & Kolhapur) & Cricket (Runners-Ahmednagar) between 1987–1991

Captained Agassaim FC in the Goa First Div. Football League 1989–90.

Played for Salgaocar Sports Club, Goa from 1990–91 to 1998–99 – Best Performance: Top Scorer in the All India Bandodkar Gold Cup 1992–93.

Represented Salgaocars in the Indian National Football League played at different centres in India.

Represented Goa in the Santosh Trophy – Semifinalist at Palakkad National, Kerala.

Played for Navelim YC in Kuwait under the auspices of Kuwait Indian Football Federation (KIFF)

Other sports

Crasto also played First Division Cricket for Mahalaxmi Cricket Club-Panaji and DCC-Margao from 1987 to 1991. He won the Open All Goa Amateur Badminton tournament organised by Vidyavihar-Margao in 1987. He was the All Navelim swimming champion in 1991.

Awards and honors
In 2003, Crasto was awarded Athlete of the Year in Kuwait by Cultural Recreational Club of Chinchinim (CRC Chinchinim). Kuwait Indian Football Federation presented Crasto with a special memento at the end of the 2017-18 season for his contribution towards Indian Football.

Compere
Crasto is also a popular compere and has demonstrated his wit and humor at many Goan events. He is a host and an expert sports commentator at most of the football events organized by Kuwait Indian Football Federation.

Crasto's presence as an MC was noticed at the Global Goans Convention held in 2010 and the First Konkani Film Festival held in Kuwait.

Stage singer

Crasto is also a Konkani singer and composer. He is a regular feature in almost every Konkani show or drama organized by the Goan diaspora in Kuwait, that features renowned superstars from Goa. Normally, Crasto sings along with his wife, Esparansa.

Writer
Crasto runs a blog called gaspersWorld, where he pens news articles, stories and views on different subjects. His video on Ruzai Saibinn is quite popular on social media and is also a regular contributor to Kuwait's Arab Times newspaper, Indians in Kuwait, and Mangalorean.com.

Books

Crasto launched his book entitled A Rose is Not Just a Rose. Written in the first person, A Rose is Not Just a Rose is a fiction novel—witty, humorous and talks about infatuated love.

Migrate Goa is a fiction book containing four stories – entwined in satirical humor and compelling ideology. The title story gives an insight into what the impending dawn could bring to one of the most loved and visited places in India and the world over. Crasto has dedicated the book to his brother and sister, Gabriel Crasto and Candida Madeira.

Personal life

Crasto is married to Esparansa from Sanquelim, Goa. They have a daughter named Angel Rafa Crasto. Crasto's elder brother Gabriel Crasto is also a popular figure based in Bahrain.

References

Indian footballers
Salgaocar FC players
1968 births
Living people
Association footballers not categorized by position
Footballers from Goa
People from South Goa district